Dominic Bergeris an American track and field athlete who competes in the sprint hurdles.

College career
At the University of Maryland he was a multiple time All-American and Atlantic Coast Conference champion.

International career
Berger won the 110 metres hurdles at the 2006 NACAC Under-23 Championships in Athletics.

At the 2014 USA Indoor Track and Field Championships Berger finished 2nd with a time of 7.556 second which was 0.003 seconds out of first and 0.003 seconds above third.  This finished enabled him to compete at the 2014 IAAF World Indoor Championships where he was a semifinalist.

References

External links

Living people
1986 births
American male hurdlers
Place of birth missing (living people)
Maryland Terrapins men's track and field athletes